The Romeroville Sandstone is a geologic formation in northeastern New Mexico. It likely was deposited in the Cenomanian Age of the Cretaceous Period.

Description
The formation consists of yellow-gray quartz sandstone with minor siltstone. The sandstone is planar crossbedded and bioturbated and locally pebbly. It overlies the Pajarito Formation and is in turn overlain by the Graneros Shale.

The formation is interpreted as the onset of a marine transgression of the Greenhorn cycle.

History of investigation
The formation was first named by Kues and Lucas in 1987 for previously undivided Dakota Group beds at the Romeroville Gap. Kues and Lucas also identified it at Clayton Lake and in the valley of the Dry Cimarron.

References

Bibliography 
 
 
 

Cretaceous formations of New Mexico
Upper Cretaceous Series of North America
Cenomanian Stage
Sandstone formations of the United States